Eucalyptus salicola, commonly known as salt gum, salt lake salmon gum or salt salmon gum, is a species of small to medium-sized tree that is endemic to the southwest of Western Australia. It has smooth, powdery bark, linear to narrow lance-shaped adult leaves, flower buds in groups of seven, nine or eleven, creamy white flowers and cup-shaped to hemispherical fruit.

Description
It has smooth, powdery white to pale grey bark that is salmon pink when new. Flowering occurs between January and March and the flowers are creamy-white.

This species has a similar habit to and coloration to Eucalyptus salmonophloia.

Taxonomy and naming
Eucalyptus salicola was first formally described by the botanist Ian Brooker in 1988 in the journal Nuytsia. The type specimen was collected by Brooker and Stephen Hopper in 1984 to the east of Kulja along the Mollerin North Road. The specific epithet (salicola) is from Latin words meaning "salt" and "dweller".

Distribution and habitat
Salt gum is found around salt lakes and clay pans in the Wheatbelt and Goldfields-Esperance regions of Western Australia where it grows in red sandy clay-loam soils. The distribution is scattered but widespread extending from as far west as Newdegate to the Great Victoria Desert in the east.

It occurs in woodland communities with associated overstorey species including E. loxophleba, E. salubris, E. myriadena, E. annulata and E. brachycorys. Low trees include Callitris columellaris and Pittosporum angustifolium.

Cultivation
The tree is commercially available and is use for land reclamation and firewood production. It is moderately slow growing but is salt tolerant and can also tolerate waterlogged soils.

Use
The wood is also used by craftsman with good screwholding and excellent for turning, machinability, sanding and finishing.

See also
List of Eucalyptus species

References

Eucalypts of Western Australia
Trees of Australia
salicola
Myrtales of Australia
Plants described in 1988
Taxa named by Ian Brooker